Works of fiction dealing with mental illness include:

In children's books

 The Tale of Samuel Whiskers or The Roly-Poly Pudding, 1908 children's book by Beatrix Potter. Tom Kitten comes out of his ordeal with a crippling phobia of rats, and possible posttraumatic stress disorder as well.

In young adult novels 

 Lisa, Bright and Dark, 1968 novel by John Neufeld. A story about a teenager's descent into madness.
 The Underground, 1998 science fiction book by K. A. Applegate. A form of oatmeal is found to drive extraterrestrial body-snatchers insane.
 Thirteen Reasons Why, 2007 novel by Jay Asher. About a teenage girl who is suffering from depression which results in suicide. Many other characters are also suffering from mental illnesses including bipolar, anxiety, PTSD, and also depression.
 Saint Jude, 2011 novel by Dawn Wilson. Suffering from manic-depressive illness, Taylor spends her senior year of high school at a place called Saint Jude's—essentially a group home for teenagers with mental illnesses.
Freaks Like Us, 2012 young adult novel by Susan Vaught.  The reader is taken on a suspenseful adventure through the mind of a schizophrenic teenage boy.
Forgive Me, Leonard Peacock, 2013 novel by Matthew Quick.

In mainstream literature 
Ajax, circa 450 – 430 BC; tragedy by Sophocles
 Heracles, 416 BC tragedy by Euripides and Hercules Furens, c. AD 40–60 tragedy by Seneca the Younger, both of which cover Hera filling Hercules with a homicidal madness.
 Orlando Furioso, 1516-1532; epic poem by Ludovico Ariosto, tells the story of Orlando, Charlemagne's most famous paladin, who goes mad upon learning that Angelica, the woman he is in love with, has run away with a Saracen knight.  Filled with despair, Orlando travel through Europe and Africa destroying everything in his path. The English knight Astolfo flies up in a flaming chariot to the Moon, where everything lost on Earth is to be found, including Orlando's wits. He brings them back in a bottle and makes Orlando sniff them, thus restoring him to sanity. (At the same time Orlando falls out of love with Angelica, as the author explains that love is itself a form of insanity.)
 Hamlet, circa 1600; tragedy by William Shakespeare
 Don Quixote, 1605/1615 two-volume novel by Miguel de Cervantes, involves a man whose worldview is influenced by fictional works, especially of chivalric exploits. Because of his refusal to conform to social conventions, he is perceived as mad by his contemporaries, without further evidence of a mental defect or illness. 
 The Sorrows of Young Werther, 1774 epistolary novel by Johann Wolfgang von Goethe.
 Faust I, 1808 tragedy by Goethe. The collision of a natural love-desire with her conscience and with the norms of the society around her evokes radical inner conflicts for the female hero Margarete.
 Mandeville, 1817 novel by William Godwin. A tale of madness that takes place during the English Civil War.
 The Bride of Lammermoor, 1819 historical novel by Sir Walter Scott. Lucy's mind snaps when she's made to jilt the man she loves and marry someone else.
 Diary of a Madman, 1835 farcical short story by Nikolai Gogol.
 Lenz, 1836 novella fragment by Georg Büchner depicting the unfolding of mental disorder with the German poet Jakob Michael Reinhold Lenz.
 The Count of Monte Cristo: 1844 novel by Alexandre Dumas. One of the people who wronged Dantès goes mad from the latter's vengeance.
 Jane Eyre, an 1847 novel by Charlotte Brontë.
 Villette, an 1853 novel by Charlotte Brontë.
Aurelia (Aurélia ou le rêve et la vie), an 1855 autobiography (posthumously published) of insanity by Gérald de Nerval.
 Madame Bovary, 1856 novel by Gustave Flaubert.
 Hard Cash, 1863 novel by Charles Reade about the injustice and poor treatment of the insane and allegedly insane.
 Crime and Punishment, 1866 novel by Fyodor Dostoevsky.
 Strangers and Pilgrims, 1873 novel by Mary Elizabeth Braddon.
 Strange Case of Dr Jekyll and Mr Hyde, 1886 novella by Robert Louis Stevenson.
 Hunger (Sult in the original Norwegian), 1890 novel by Knut Hamsun depicting a man whose mind slowly turns to ruin through hunger.
 The Picture of Dorian Gray, 1891 novel by Oscar Wilde, centering on a handsome, narcissistic young man enthralled by the "new" hedonism of the times.
 Ward Number Six, 1892 short story by Anton Chekhov.
 The Yellow Wallpaper, 1892 short story by Charlotte Perkins Gilman.
 The Adventure of the Devil's Foot, 1910 mystery short story by Sir Arthur Conan Doyle. The fumes from burning the powder of a toxic plant with extreme fear-inducing properties destroy the minds of those who survive its effects--unless one gets away fast.
 Remembrance of Things Past, 1913–1927 seven-volume novel by Marcel Proust.
 Swann's Way, 1913 work by Marcel Proust.
 Zeno's Conscience, 1923 novel by Italo Svevo. The main character is Zeno Cosini, and the book is the fictional character's memoirs that he keeps at the insistence of his psychiatrist. Zeno's Conscience is most notably influential for being one of the first modernist novels with a non-linear structure and told by an unreliable narrator.
 Christina Alberta's Father, 1925 novel by H.G. Wells. The story tells how a retired laundryman suffered from delusions that he was the reincarnation of Sargon, King of Kings, returned to earth as Lord of the World.
 The Shutter of Snow, 1930 novel by Emily Holmes Coleman. Portrays the post-partum psychosis of Marthe Gail, who after giving birth to her son, is committed to an insane asylum.
 Flight into Darkness (German original: Flucht in die Finsternis), 1931 novella by Arthur Schnitzler.
 Tender is the Night, 1934 novel by F. Scott Fitzgerald.
 Private Worlds, 1934 novel by Phyllis Bottome. Tells the story of the staff and patients at a mental hospital in which a caring female psychiatrist and her colleague face discrimination by a conservative new supervisor.
 The A.B.C. Murders, 1936 detective fiction novel by Agatha Christie that revolves around the nature of homicidal lunatics, to a surprising twist reveal.
 The Outward Room, 1937 novel by Millen Brand. Details a young woman's recovery in a mental hospital during the Great Depression after she suffers a nervous breakdown following her brother's sudden death.
 Appointment with Death, 1938 detective fiction novel by Agatha Christie. One of Mrs. Boynton's daughters has paranoid schizophrenia from her mother's tormenting of her.
 And Then There Were None, 1939 detective fiction/psychological horror novel by Agatha Christie. As the ordeal drags on, the fewer and fewer who survive go insane under the prolonged strain.
 The Royal Game (or Chess Story; Schachnovelle in the original German), 1942 novella by Stefan Zweig, depicting a monarchist who develops, and then cannot again shed, the custom to separate his psyche into two personas, having been urged to maintain his sanity by playing chess against himself in solitary confinement.
 Earth Abides, 1949 post-apocalyptic science-fiction novel by George Stewart, deals with the human reactions to living when nearly everyone else died.
 The Catcher in the Rye, 1951 novel by J. D. Salinger.
 Lover, When You're Near Me, 1952 science fiction short story by Richard Matheson on a man being traumatically steered in his will by a woman of a dull extraterrestrial race who covets him sexually.
 Dear Diary, 1954 science fiction short story by Richard Matheson. Diary entries from the years AD 1964, AD 3964, and LXIV (=64) all show the same dissatisfaction with the current situation and the same desire to live either some thousand years later or earlier, that from 3964 also due to the unpleasant inventions of another inhabitant of the writer's plastic skyscraper, which enable him to see her through the walls.
 The Hobbit, The Two Towers, and The Return of the King; 1937, 1954, and 1955 high fantasy novels by J. R. R. Tolkien. The creature Gollum, a hobbit with Dissociative Identity Disorder, plays a major role. Also, a magical effect of treasure recently held by a dragon is that individuals susceptible to greed develop a form of greedy paranoia called the Dragon Sickness.
 The Mind Thing, incomplete 1960 science fiction serialization, later published as a novel, by Fredric Brown. An extraterrestrial being has been sent to Earth as a punishment and tries to influence people's and animal's minds so that they would help it creating the technical means it needs to return home.
 To Kill A Mockingbird, 1960 novel by Harper Lee.
 Unearthly Neighbors, 1960 science fiction novel by Chad Oliver. The anthropology professor Monte Stewart and the linguist Charlie Jenike get angry at each other on a hot day, after having killed a member of a race between apes and men on a planet of Sirius together, in revenge for a deadly attack of the man's tribe onto their wives and a colleague. Jenike loses his mind and drowns himself in a nearby river shortly after.
 One Flew Over the Cuckoo's Nest, 1962 novel by Ken Kesey about the treatment of mental illness.
Nilo, mi hijo, a 1963 play by Antonio González Caballero.
 The Bell Jar, 1963 novel by Sylvia Plath, a fictionalised account of Plath's own struggles with depression.
 Wide Sargasso Sea, a 1966 retelling of Jane Eyre by Jean Rhys.
 Clans of the Alphane Moon, 1964 science-fiction novel by Philip K. Dick. Largely set on a world in which a lost group of former psychiatric patients have organised themselves into caste-like groups along psychiatric diagnostic lines, forming an unusual but functional society.
 I Never Promised You a Rose Garden, 1964 autobiographical novel by Joanne Greenberg.
 A Wrinkle in the Skin, 1965 post-apocalyptic science fiction novel by John Christopher. The hero and a boy meet a captain who has lost his mind, in his ship on the bottom of the English Channel that has fallen dry through an earthquake. They are welcomed heartily, but forbidden to take any food with them, when they leave.
 The Bird of Paradise, 1967 work by R. D. Laing, often available with his non-fiction essay The Politics of Experience about schizophrenia and hallucinogenic drugs.
 The Ethics of Madness, 1967 science fiction short story by Larry Niven.
 Bedlam Planet, 1968 science fiction novel by John Brunner. A crew of astronauts tries to live on the animal and vegetable food growing on a planet of Sigma Draconis, which evokes mental disorder, but also sets free survival instincts that have so far been hidden.
 The Sword, 1968 fantasy short story by Lloyd Alexander. A king yields to anger, with lethal results, in a moment of weakness. As he grows worse and worse, he also develops a severe case of paranoia, fearing assassination and other revenge plots around every corner.
 Knots, 1970 work by R.D. Laing.
 Diving into the Wreck, 1973 collection of poetry by Adrienne Rich.
 Sybil, 1973 novel by Flora Rheta Schreiber.
 Breakfast of Champions, 1973 novel by Kurt Vonnegut.
 The Eden Express, 1975 memoir by Mark Vonnegut .
 Woman on the Edge of Time, 1976 novel by Marge Piercy.
 The Silmarillion, 1977 collection of myths by J. R. R. Tolkien. The account of the rise and fall of Númenor states that one of the kings, Tar-Atanamir, was "witless and unmanned" in his final years.
 The Language of Goldfish, 1980 young adult novel by Zibby Oneal
 Norwegian Wood, 1987 novel by Haruki Murakami 
 The Cat Who Went Underground, 1989 detective fiction novel by Lillian Jackson Braun
 Doom Patrol, a comic book series originating in 1963. During Grant Morrison's 1989 – 1993 run it included the multiple personality affected Crazy Jane and several other characters either insane or in possession of greater truths.
 American Psycho. 1991 novel by Bret Easton Ellis.
 Heir to the Empire, Dark Force Rising, and The Last Command, 1991 trilogy of novels by Timothy Zahn. Joruus C'baoth, the clone of a tragic Jedi Master from the final years of the Old Republic, is insane due to his hyper-accelerated physical and mental development.
 Mariel of Redwall, 1991 fantasy novel by Brian Jacques. Pirate warlord Gabool grows increasingly paranoid about possible threats to his power and develops delusions about a stolen bell.
 Regeneration, 1991 novel by Pat Barker, based on the historical experiences of the poet Siegfried Sassoon, explores shell-shock and other traumatic illnesses following World War I.
 Amnesia, 1992 novel by Douglas Anthony Cooper.
 She's Come Undone, 1992 novel by Wally Lamb.
 Girl, Interrupted, 1993 memoir by Susanna Kaysen.
 Prozac Nation, 1994 memoir by Elizabeth Wurtzel.
 Effie's Burning, 1995 play by Valerie Windsor.
 Maskerade, 1995 comic fantasy/detective fiction novel by Sir Terry Pratchett.
 Myst: The Book of Atrus, 1995 novel (re-released in a 2004 omnibus) by Rand and Robyn Miller with Dave Wingrove. Atrus comes to realize that his father is a megalomaniac.
 Fight Club, 1996 novel by Chuck Palahniuk.
 The Green Mile, 1996 serial novel by Stephen King.
 Enduring Love, 1997 novel Ian McEwan.
 Glimmer, 1997 novel by Annie Waters.
 Glamorama. 1998 novel by Bret Easton Ellis.
 I Know This Much Is True, 1998 novel by Wally Lamb.
 Willow Weep for Me: A Black Woman's Journey Through Depression, 1998 memoir by Meri Nana-Ama Danquah.
 Cut, 2000 novel by Patricia McCormick.
 Borderline, 2000 novel by Marie-Sissi Labrèche.
 La Brèche, 2002 novel by Marie-Sissi Labrèche.
 Oxygen and The Fifth Man, 2001 and 2002 science fiction duology by Randall S. Ingermanson and John B. Olson. One of the astronauts on a Mars mission grows increasingly paranoid.
 Harry Potter and the Order of the Phoenix, 2003 fantasy novel by J. K. Rowling, includes a scene with a couple who both have profound dementia resulting from prolonged magical torture.
 The Unifying Force, 2003 science fiction novel by James Luceno.
 The Curious Incident of the Dog in the Nighttime, 2003 novel by Mark Haddon.
 The Good Patient: A Novel, 2004 novel by Kristin Waterfield Duisberg.
 Set This House in Order, a 2004 novel by Matt Ruff. Revolving around a romance between two characters with multiple personalities.
 Hello, Serotonin, 2004 work by Jon Paul Fiorentino.
 High Rhulain, 2005 fantasy novel by Brian Jacques. Between his battle injuries and a traumatic bereavement, Long Patrol Major Cuthbert Blanedaale Frunk has developed Dissociative Identity Disorder.
 Human Traces, 2005 novel by Sebastian Faulks. Two psychiatrists set in the late 19th and early 20th century.
 Love Creeps, 2005 novel by Amanda Filipacchi. A comedic book about a love triangle who are stalking each other.
 A Spot of Bother, 2006 novel by Mark Haddon, written from the point of view of a 57-year-old hypochondriac man who suffers from extreme panic attacks and also develops dementia
 Darkness Descending, 2007 novel by Bethann Korsmit about a man who suffers a mental breakdown and various other mental problems, and the people who help him to overcome the obstacles in his life.
 The Vegetarian, 2007 novel by Han Kang.
 All in the Mind, 2008 novel by Alastair Campbell which draws on the author's experiences of depression and alcoholism
 Atmospheric Disturbances, 2009 novel by Rivka Galchen. About a psychiatrist and one of his patients with a mental illness. 
 The Wilderness, 2009 novel by Samantha Harvey about Alzheimer's.
 Radiant Daughter, 2010 novel by Patricia Grossman. A story that is about a Czech family with a daughter who is suffering from bipolar disorder.
Blepharospasm, 2011 novel by Harutyun Mackoushian. A story that focuses on a boy suffering from anxiety.
 A Better Place, 2011 novel by Mark A. Roeder.
The Heart of Darkness, 2014 novel by Dominic Lyne. Through conversations with his therapist, he tries to make sense of the world around him and his inability to do so pulls him deeper into the depths of his delusions.
Challenger Deep, 2015 young adult novel by Neal Shusterman. The first half of the book leaves the audience questioning if the plot is real, but it ends up being about mental illnesses. From the point of view of somebody with a mental illness.
 The Suicide of Claire Bishop, 2015 novel by Carmiel Banasky.  Schizophrenia, Alzheimer's, and suicide are main topics.
Turtles All The Way Down, 2018 novel by John Green, which features a young woman navigating daily existence within the ever-tightening spiral of her own thoughts.
Everything Here Is Beautiful, 2018 novel by Mira T. Lee. An immigrant story, and a young woman’s quest to find fulfillment and a life unconstrained by her illness.
 Cleopatra in Space 2014-2020 graphic novel series by Mike Maihack. The protagonist, Cleopatra "Cleo" has a bit of ADHD and was written from the beginning as having "depressive disorder."
The Drowning Girl, 2012 novel by Caitlin R. Kiernan. The protagonist, a young woman afflicted with hereditary schizophrenia, becomes infatuated with the lone survivor of a suicide cult.
My Half-Sister's Half-Sister, 2021 novel by Samantha Henthorn. The protagonist accuses her family of practising witchcraft until it is revealed that she is psychotic and is admitted to a mental health ward.

Motion pictures

Many motion pictures portray mental illness in inaccurate ways, leading to misunderstanding and heightened stigmatization of the mentally ill. However, some movies are lauded for dispelling stereotypes and providing insight into mental illness. In a study by George Gerbner, it was determined that 5 percent of 'normal' television characters are murderers, while 20% of 'mentally-ill' characters are murderers. 40% of normal characters are violent, while 70% of mentally-ill characters are violent. Contrary to what is portrayed in films and television, Henry J. Steadman, Ph.D., and his colleagues at Policy Research Associates found that, overall, formal mental patients did not have a higher rate of violence than the control group of people who were not formal mental patients. In both groups, however, substance abuse was linked to a higher rate of violence. (Hockenbury and Hockenbury, 2004)

 Psycho, a 1960 American film which features a man who exhibits multiple personality-disorder (includes several prequels or sequels or remakes)
 Marnie, a 1964 American film which features a woman with obsessive fear and distrust
 Oil Lamps, a 1971 film by Juraj Herz, based on the same named novel by Jaroslav Havlíček, describing the life of a vivacious girl and her matrimony with a sardonic man, who suffers from emerging paralytic dementia
 Benny & Joon, a 1993 American film which features a woman with schizophrenia.
 Memento, a 2000 psychological thriller film about a man with anterograde amnesia which renders his brain unable to store new memories.
 A Beautiful Mind, a 2001 film which is a fictionalised account of a mathematician with schizophrenia, John Nash.
 The Soloist, a 2009 film depicting the true story of Nathaniel Ayers, a musical prodigy who develops schizophrenia during his second year at Juilliard School, becomes homeless and plays a two stringed violin in the streets of Downtown Los Angeles.
 Silver Linings Playbook, a 2012 film about a bipolar man and his relationship with a depressed young widow.

Television
Many popular television shows feature characters with a mental health condition. Often these portrayals are inaccurate and reinforce existing stereotypes, thereby increasing stigma associated with having a mental health condition. Common ways that television shows can generate misunderstanding and fear are by depicting people with these conditions as medically noncompliant, violent, and/or intellectually challenged. However, in recent years certain organizations have begun to advocate for accurate portrayals of mental health conditions in the media, and certain television shows have been applauded by mental health organizations for helping to dispel myths of these conditions.

One show, Wonderland, went on the air in 2000 and only lasted several episodes. It was largely critically acclaimed, but pressure from mental health advocates and people with mental health conditions, who felt that the show perpetuated stereotypes and contributed to the stigma attached to them, led to the show's cancellation.

The Scandinavian crime drama The Bridge features multiple examples of mental illness, most prominently including Münchausen syndrome by proxy.

In 2005, the shows Huff; Monk; Scrubs; and ER all won Voice Awards from the Substance Abuse and Mental Health Services Administration for their positive portrayal of people who manage mental health conditions. Neal Baer, executive producer of ER and Law & Order: Special Victims Unit also won a lifetime achievement award for his work in incorporating mental health issues into these two shows.

United States of Tara is a television show about dissociative identity disorder.

The Steven Universe franchise features characters with psychological trauma.

The animated Netflix series, Bojack Horseman dives into themes about depression, generalized anxiety, self-destructive behavior, post-traumatic stress disorder, narcissism and substance abuse

The Animated Netflix series, Arcane (TV series) presents the story of two sisters suffering from extreme trauma. Fans trust Jinx suffers from borderline personality disorder, PTSD and Schizophrenia, while Vi has extreme childhood trauma.

Video games
The game Silent Hill 2 of the same genres contains three major characters struggling with mental illness.  Though their conditions are never named, two of these characters exhibit symptoms which, together with their backstories, may suggest acute dissociative amnesia; while the third character most definitively approximates body dysmorphic disorder. (The topic of dissociative amnesia is revisited in later installments of the series.) In addition, both this game and Silent Hill 3 mention various former patients of the now-abandoned town's local psychiatric hospital, with one said patient making an appearance in the latter game.

Life is Strange deals with depression, suicide most notably, as the main character Max tries to prevent the suicide of one of her friends. One of the characters exhibits concerning behaviors and is prescribed medicines most often associated with bipolar and schizophrenia. It is implied he is seeing a psychiatrist.

Danganronpa: Trigger Happy Havoc deals with a side character named Toko Fukawa who suffers from DID. Her first identity being a well-known writer. Her second identity was a serial killer. The next character who has a canon mental illness is Nagito Komaeda, a loved character from Danganronpa 2: Goodbye Despair who suffers from lymphoma in stage 3 and has Frontotemporal dementia.

Final Fantasy VII implies numerous times that the main character, Cloud Strife, has some form of schizophrenia or schizoaffective disorder as well as post-traumatic stress disorder.

In Pokémon Sword and Shield, Chairman Rose is shown to have a severe idée fixe about a far-off energy crisis.

See also
 List of mental disorders in film

Notes

 
Literary motifs